JJ Lee is a Canadian writer. His debut book, The Measure of a Man: The Story of a Father, a Son, and a Suit, was published in 2011 and was shortlisted for the 2011 Governor General's Award for English non-fiction, the 2012 Charles Taylor Prize,  and the 2012 Hilary Weston Writers' Trust Prize for Nonfiction.

Based in Vancouver, British Columbia, Lee is also a fashion columnist and art critic for various media outlets in Vancouver, including CBC Radio, the Vancouver Sun and the Georgia Straight, as well as a producer for CBC Radio. The Measure of a Man was originally prepared as a radio documentary on the social history of men's suits for the CBC Radio program Ideas.

References

External links
 

Canadian non-fiction writers
Canadian art critics
Canadian radio producers
Writers from Vancouver
Canadian writers of Asian descent
Living people
Year of birth missing (living people)